The 1955–56 Hong Kong First Division League season was the 45th since its establishment.

League table

References
1955–56  Hong Kong First Division table (RSSSF)

Hong Kong First Division League seasons
Hong
1